Petalium bistriatum is a species of beetle in the family Ptinidae. It is found in North America.

Subspecies
These four subspecies belong to the species Petalium bistriatum:
 Petalium bistriatum arizonense Fall
 Petalium bistriatum bicolor Fall
 Petalium bistriatum bistriatum
 Petalium bistriatum debile Fall

References

Further reading

 
 
 

Petalium
Articles created by Qbugbot
Beetles described in 1825